An Zuozhang (10 January 1927 – 20 February 2019) was a Chinese historian who specialized in ancient Chinese history and the regional history of Shandong. A lifelong professor of Shandong Normal University, he was considered in China as a leading expert in the history of Qin and Han dynasties.

Biography 
An was born on 10 January 1927 in Cao County, Shandong, Republic of China. After graduating from the Department of History of Cheeloo University in 1951, he served as a faculty member in the history department of Shandong Normal University until his death. From 1985 to 1989 he also served as director of the university's Research Institute of Ancient Documents.

In 1954, two of his papers, on the military colonies and agricultural officials of the Western Han dynasty, respectively, were published in the influential national newspaper Guangming Daily, a rare feat for a 27-year-old historian.

An published more than 100 academic papers and more than 30 books. A number of them, including A Draft History of Qin and Han Officialdom, Biography of Liu Bang, A Cultural History of Canals in China, General History of Shandong, General Cultural History of Shandong, and General History of Chinese Acrobatic Art, were awarded the Shandong Provincial Social Science Research Prize (First Class).

An was considered in China as a leading expert in the history of the Qin and Han dynasties. In his view, the governing principle of the Western Han (or Xi Han) dynasty was "doing nothing against nature" and ensuring "a peaceful environment to develop the economy". He was recognized by the Government of Shandong as a "top provincial expert", and was awarded a special pension by the State Council of China. He was elected a delegate to the 13th National Congress of the Chinese Communist Party.

On 20 February 2019, An died of a heart attack at the age of 92.

References 

1927 births
2019 deaths
20th-century Chinese historians
21st-century Chinese historians
Historians of China
Cheeloo University alumni
Academic staff of Shandong Normal University
Writers from Heze
Historians from Shandong
History of Shandong
Educators from Shandong